Le Grand Marché is a supermarket chain based in Sint Maarten in the Caribbean. It began operations in 2002.

Le Grand Marche is operating on 4 locations: Bush Road, Le Grande Marche, Cole Bay, Le Grande Marche, Porto Cupecoy, Le Gourmet Marche, and Simpson Bay, Le Gourmet Marche. It employs around 200 people at its 4 stores.

History

The first supermarket was opened at Bush Road on 18 November 2002. The second supermarket was opened at Simpson Bay on 2 October 2006. The Simpson Bay supermarket is called 'Le Gourmet Marché'. The third supermarket was opened at Colebay on 30 October 2006. The fourth supermarket opened in April 2010 in Porto Cupecoy in the Dutch Lowlands. It is a "Le Gourmet Marche".

Locations
 Bush Road, Philipsburg, Sint Maarten
 Cole Bay, Near French Border Sint Maarten
 Simpson Bay, Near Marinas close to Princess Juliana International Airport
 Porto Cupecoy, in www.portocupecoy.com

External links
Official website
About Le Grand Marche
Le Grand Marche History
Le Grand Marche Media Gallery

Supermarkets of North America